AU Convention Center is a  convention at Beach road, Pandurangapuram, Visakhapatnam it was inaugurated in the year of 2017  by Vice-President of India  Venkaiah Naidu.

About
The building cost र 13.5-crore to construct and seating capacity of 2000 seats.

References

Convention centres in India
Buildings and structures in Visakhapatnam